When Lust Evokes the Curse is the debut studio album by the Dutch gothic metal band Autumn.

Track listing
All music written by Autumn; all lyrics written by Meindert Sterk, except where noted.

"Who Has Seen Her Wave Her Hand" – 6:56
"Mirrors Magic Sights" – 5:07
"When Lust Evokes the Curse" – 4:47
"Floating Towards Distress" – 4:07
"Behind the Walls of Her Desire" – 4:47
"The Witch in Me" – 5:53
"Along Ethereal Levels" – 6:18
"Crown of Thoughts" (Lyrics: Menno Terpstra)– 5:33
"For Those Who Are Left Behind" – 4:27
"Quiet Friend" (Lyrics: D. Reedyk)– 5:32
"The Rest of My Days" – 6:28

Personnel
Nienke de Jong - vocals; whispers on "Floating Towards Distress"
Jasper Koenders - guitars, flute; whispers on "Floating Towards Distress"
Jens van der Valk - guitars
Menno Terpstra - keyboards; whispers on "Floating Towards Distress"
Meindert Sterk - bass, grunts
Jan Grijpstra - drums

References

External links
 Autumn official website

2000 albums
Autumn (band) albums